Cypress Hill III: Temples of Boom is the third studio album by Latin-American hip hop group Cypress Hill. It was released on October 31, 1995 by Ruffhouse and Columbia Records. It was the first album to feature Eric Bobo as an official member of the group. The album featured a stylistic change, as the group turned towards a darker, tranquil, slower, and spookier sound with their beats. The album went Platinum in the U.S. with 1 million units sold.

Background

With this album, the group turned towards a more tranquil, sedate, slower, spooky sound with their beats.

Wu-Tang Clan members RZA and U-God both make an appearance on the track "Killa Hill Niggas".

Also notable was the track "No Rest for the Wicked", which ignited the feud between Cypress Hill and rapper Ice Cube who they claimed stole the hook from the group’s single "Throw Your Set in the Air", for his song “Friday” from the movie Friday.
At the peak of the feud on the “Temples Of Boom” tour, the group would take time in between songs to talk about this and get the crowd to yell obscenities about Ice Cube.

The darker mood tone reflected the strife in the 90’s and the different aspects the group faced as they became more famous. During this era member Sen Dog temporarily left the band to pursue other projects.

Reception

Rolling Stone - 3.5 Stars - Good - "…half of III bumps with a new and improved Cypress Hill sound that marks producer Muggs' progress.… For all the rude immediacy of its rhymes, III is an album of many musical hues…Cypress Hill still wield an intoxicating power that's all their own…"
Q - 4 Stars - Excellent - "The production is sophisticated, incorporating Indian sitar and sloping, almost psychedelic bass grooves to create a vaguely threatening ambient hardcore."
Melody Maker - Bloody Essential - "…resonates with freakish cheese-wire paranoia…a gobsmacking paradox of expansive claustrophobia.… The funk patters like an erratic heartbeat, the voices are stretched to bursting with menace and loathing and mockery…"
Rap Pages - 7 (out of 10) - "B-Real spits out lyric after lyric lambasting critics, ex-homies and anyone else not down with his familia.… Some of the record might sound familiar, but, hey, that's the Cypress sound."
NME - 7 (out of 10) - "At its most powerful, tuneful, sarcastic and entertaining, it's sneering '90s hip-hop.… In the weeks of the OJ fall-out and the Nation Of Islam Million Man March, Cypress Hill have made the album which reflects US and, therefore, global paranoia with spookily apt timing."

Track listing
All tracks produced by DJ Muggs, except track 5 produced by RZA

Personnel

B-Real - Vocals
Sen Dog - Vocals
Shag - Backing vocalist
Eric "Bobo" Correa - Conga
Red Dog - Organ, Bass guitar
DJ Muggs - Arranger, Producer, Mixing
Jason Roberts - Engineer, Mixing
RZA - Producer, Engineer, Mixing, Guest vocals
U-God - Guest vocals
Ben Wallach - Assistant Engineer
Lamont Hyde - Assistant Engineer

Dante Ariola - Design
Jamie Caliri - Cover Photo
Codikow - Representation
Ricky Harris - Interlude
Manny Lecouna - Mastering
Joe Nicolo - Mixing
Ross Donaldson - Mixing
Jay Papke - Design
Ken Schles - Photography
Chris McCann - Photography
Happy Walters - Management

Charts
Album - Billboard (North America)

Certifications

References

External links

Cypress Hill albums
1995 albums
Columbia Records albums
Albums produced by DJ Muggs
Albums produced by RZA
Ruffhouse Records albums